The 1995 Amway Classic was a women's tennis tournament played on outdoor hard courts at the ASB Tennis Centre in Auckland, New Zealand that was part of Tier IV of the 1995 WTA Tour. It was the 10th edition of the tournament and was held from 30 January until 5 February 1995. Unseeded Nicole Bradtke, who entered on a wildcard, won the singles title and earned $17,5000 first-prize money.

Finals

Singles

 Nicole Bradtke defeated  Ginger Helgeson-Nielsen 3–6, 6–2, 6–1
 It was Bradtke's only title of the year and the 11th of her career.

Doubles

 Jill Hetherington /  Elna Reinach defeated  Laura Golarsa /  Caroline Vis 7–6, 6–2
 It was Hetherington's 1st title of the year and the 14th of her career. It was Reinach's only title of the year and the 11th of her career.

See also
 1995 Benson and Hedges Open – men's tournament

External links
 ITF tournament edition details
 Tournament draws

Amway Classic
WTA Auckland Open
AM
ASB
ASB
1995 in New Zealand tennis